Sakkare (English : Sugar) is a 2013 Indian Kannada-language romantic drama film written and directed by Abhaya Simha, which stars Ganesh and Deepa Sannidhi in the lead roles. The major portions of the film have been shot in Madikeri, Bangalore, Mysore and other places.

The film is produced jointly by B. Suresha and Shylaja Nag of Media House Productions and the music is scored by V. Harikrishna.

Cast
 Ganesh as Vinay/Vinny
 Deepa Sannidhi as Neha
 Ananth Nag as Col Cariappa
 Anu Prabhakar as Sneha 
 Vinaya Prasad as Vasundhara
 Achyuth Kumar
 Rajesh Nataranga
 Siddaraja Kalyankar

Production

Launch
The film shooting officially began at the Dodda Ganapati Temple, near Basavanagudi, Bangalore. The Pooja was held quite early in the morning and immediately thereafter the unit members moved to Madikeri for further shooting of the film. The film is being produced by Shylaja Nag and B. Suresha of Media House Productions and directed by Abhay Simha who had already directed an award-winning film Gubbachchigalu earlier and bilingual film Shikari with Malayalam Super Star Mammootty in the lead role.

Hari Krishna is the music director of the film for which all the five songs of the film has been written by Yogaraj Bhat. The film will be shot for ten days in Madikeri after which the unit is returning to Bangalore.

Casting
After Ganesh's confirmed presence for the film, the director approached actress Radhika Pandit to essay the female lead role. However, due to her previous appointments with the film Drama, she could not allot her dates. Later Deepa Sannidhi was roped in her place. Actor Prakash Rai was first approached for a key role which he rejected and instead Ananth Nag replaced for the same.

Soundtrack
The music of the film is composed by V. Harikrishna with lyrics by Yogaraj Bhat and Jayanth Kaikini.

Critical reception 
Srikanth Srinivasa of Rediff.com wrote that "Sakkare seems to send a message that it is a movie for all those who are romantic at heart".

References

External links
 

Films set in Bangalore
2010s Kannada-language films
Indian romantic drama films
2013 romantic drama films
2013 films
Films scored by V. Harikrishna
Films directed by Abhaya Simha